Sara Yaneisy Álvarez Menéndez (born 10 July 1975) is a Spanish former judoka who competed in the 1996 Summer Olympics, in the 2000 Summer Olympics, and in the 2004 Summer Olympics.

References

External links
 
 

1975 births
Living people
Spanish female judoka
Olympic judoka of Spain
Judoka at the 1996 Summer Olympics
Judoka at the 2000 Summer Olympics
Judoka at the 2004 Summer Olympics
Mediterranean Games gold medalists for Spain
Mediterranean Games medalists in judo
Competitors at the 2005 Mediterranean Games
20th-century Spanish women
21st-century Spanish women